Whittingslow is a hamlet in Shropshire, England.

It is located in the parish of Wistanstow, just off the B4370 road, between Marshbrook and Cwm Head. The hamlet lies on a hilltop, at 252m above sea level. The lane from the B4370 continues, along a ridge of hills, to the hamlet of Woolston in the southwest and then on to the village of Wistanstow itself.

Hamlets in Shropshire